Rob Brown (born February 27, 1962) is an American free jazz saxophonist and composer.

Life and career
Brown was born in Hampton, Virginia, United States. He started playing saxophone at the age of 12. His first gigs were with a local Virginia swing band. He eventually studied at Berklee College for two years, and worked privately with both Joe Viola and John LaPorta. After a year on the west coast, Brown relocated to Boston, Massachusetts, where he met pianist Matthew Shipp. He moved to New York in 1985, where he enrolled at New York University, earned a music degree, and studied with saxophone masters such as Lee Konitz, but the teacher who had more influence on Brown conceptually was Philadelphian Dennis Sandole. Brown travelled to Philadelphia by rail once a week to study with him for a year and a half.

His first issued recording was the duet with Shipp Sonic Explorations (1988), and since then has been actively leading groups or working as a sideman with Shipp, William Parker, Whit Dickey, Joe Morris and Steve Swell.

He is a 2001 CalArts/Alpert/Ucross Residency Prize winner and has received many Meet The Composer Fund grants. In 2006, Brown was awarded a Chamber Music America New Works grant.

Discography

As leader/co-leader

As sideman

References

External links
Official site
Rob Brown: No More "Mr. Avant Garde" by John Sharpe at All About Jazz

American jazz saxophonists
American male saxophonists
Avant-garde jazz musicians
1962 births
Living people
Musicians from Hampton, Virginia
Steinhardt School of Culture, Education, and Human Development alumni
Berklee College of Music alumni
21st-century American saxophonists
Jazz musicians from Virginia
21st-century American male musicians
American male jazz musicians
Clean Feed Records artists
AUM Fidelity artists
RogueArt artists